Orange Park Mall is a shopping mall located in Bellair-Meadowbrook Terrace, an unincorporated suburban area just west of Orange Park, Florida, United States. It features Dillard's, JCPenney,  Belk, Dick's Sporting Goods, and AMC Theatres as anchor stores.

Mall history
First opened in 1975, the Orange Park Mall is the largest mall on the west side of the St. Johns River in the Jacksonville area. The mall contains over 110 stores and services. When it opened, it featured three anchors: Ivey's, May Cohen's, and Sears, like Volusia Mall a year before. In 1984, the mall added  that included a new food court and a JCPenney anchor. May Cohen's became May Florida shortly before being acquired by Maison Blanche in June 1988. Ivey's changed to Dillard's in June 1990. Maison Blanche was in turn taken over by Gayfers in early 1992 due to Mercantile Stores buying the chain. In 1997, the mall built a 24-screen AMC Theatres. Gayfers finally ended up as Belk in late 1998 because Mercantile was bought out by Dillard's which already had a store at the mall. Later, in 2006, the mall added a  Dick's Sporting Goods anchor. On February 8, 2020, it was announced that Sears would be closing as part of a plan to close 39 stores nationwide. The store closed in April 2020.

Anchors
JCPenney 
Dillard's
Belk
Dick's Sporting Goods
AMC Theatres

Former
Sears (closed April 2020)
Ivey's (converted to Dillard's)
May Co. (converted to Maison Blanche)
Maison Blanche (converted to Gayfers)
Gayfers (converted to Belk)

Major tenants
Old Navy 
Books-A-Million

Outparcel restaurants
Buffalo Wild Wings

Former Outparcel services
Sears Automotive (closed April 2020)

References

http://www.simon.com/Mall/LeasingSheet/62024_OrangePark.pdf

External links
Orange Park Mall official website
 

Shopping malls established in 1975
Washington Prime Group
Shopping malls in Florida